Elachista versicolora is a moth of the family Elachistidae. It is found in Transbaikal, Russia.

The length of the forewings is 4.5–5.2 mm. The forewing costa is narrowly dark grey basally, the ground colour consisting of pale ochreous and darker tipped scales giving a weakly mottled appearance in pale specimens, while in darker specimens the ground colour appears greyish brown. The hindwings are grey.

References

versicolora
Moths described in 2007
Moths of Asia